Trichobradybaena is a genus of air-breathing land snails, terrestrial pulmonate gastropod mollusks in the subfamily Bradybaeninae of the family Camaenidae.

Species
 Trichobradybaena chagangensis M. Wu & J.-Y. Guo, 2003
 Trichobradybaena submissa (Deshayes, 1874)
 Trichobradybaena tuberculata M. Wu & J.-Y. Guo, 2003

References

 Bank, R. A. (2017). Classification of the Recent terrestrial Gastropoda of the World. Last update: July 16th, 2017

External links
 Wu, M.; Guo, J. (2003). Contribution to the knowledge of the Chinese terrestrial malacofauna (Gastropoda : Pulmonata : Helicoidea): Description of a new bradybaenid genus with three species. Veliger. 46: 239-240

Camaenidae
Gastropod genera